Trigonosaurus (meaning "triangle lizard" after Triangulo Mineiro, where it was found), is a genus of saltasaurid dinosaurs from the Maastrichtian Serra da Galga Formation of Brazil. The type species, Trigonosaurus pricei, was first described by Campos, Kellner, Bertini, and Santucci in 2005. It was based on two specimens, both consisting mainly of vertebrae. The two specimens were believed to have come from the same individual. However, one specimen was described as the holotype of Caieiria in 2022. Before its description, it was known as the "Peirópolis titanosaur", after the place it was found.

History 
 
From the 1940s to 1960s, Brazilian paleontologist Llewellyn Ivor Price excavated several series of titanosaur fossils in the "Caieira" locality of the Serra da Galga Formation in Minas Gerais, Brazil. Two of these, "Series B" or MCT 1488-R and "Series C" or MCT 1490-R, were named the holotypes of two titanosaur genera in 2005: Trigonosaurus and Baurutitan respectively. The describers of Trigonosaurus also referred a series of caudal vertebrae, MCT 1719-R, as the paratype of their new genus. Further titanosaur fossils from the BR-262 site of the same locality were reported by Silva Junior and colleagues in 2022, and in light of this new evidence, reconsidered MCT 1488-R to be a specimen of Baurutitan, thus synonymizing Trigonosaurus with it. They also separated the caudal vertebrae (paratype) from Trigonosaurus and described it as the holotype of a new genus and species of titanosaur, Caieiria allocaudata.

References

External links 
 Trigonosaurus on the Dinosaur Mailing List (contains full abstract of description).

Saltasaurids
Maastrichtian life
Late Cretaceous dinosaurs of South America
Cretaceous Brazil
Fossils of Brazil
Marília Formation
Fossil taxa described in 2005
Taxa named by Alexander Kellner